Presbistus is an genus of Asian stick insects in the tribe Aschiphasmatini, erected by William Forsell Kirby in 1896.  Species currently have a known distribution in: India, Cambodia, Borneo, Java and Sumatra (but this may be incomplete).

Species 
The Phasmida Species File lists:
 Presbistus appendiculatus Bragg, 2001
 Presbistus asymmetricus Giglio-Tos, 1910
 Presbistus crudelis (Westwood, 1859)
 Presbistus darnis (Westwood, 1859)
 Presbistus flavicornis (de Haan, 1842)
 Presbistus infumatus (Charpentier, 1845)
 Presbistus marshallae Bragg, 2001
 Presbistus peleus (Gray, 1835) - type species (as Perlamorphus peleus Gray; synonym of Presbistus ridleyi Kirby, 1904)
 Presbistus viridimarginatus (de Haan, 1842)
 Presbistus vitivorus Bresseel & Constant, 2022

References

External links
Image at iNaturalist

Phasmatodea genera
Phasmatodea of Asia